Central Council of Indian Medicine (CCIM) was a statutory body under the Ministry of AYUSH, Government of India between 1971 and 2021. The CCIM was set up in 1971 under the Indian Medicine Central Council Act, (Act 48) which was passed in 1970. It is one of the Professional councils under University Grants Commission (UGC) to monitor higher education in Indian systems of medicine, including Ayurveda, Siddha, Unani and Sowa-Rigpa.

Overview
It was located in New Delhi, India. CCIM was set up to suggest the benchmarks and practices to be followed in Indian medicinal systems. CCIM had been involved in regulating the Ayurveda, Siddha and Unani Tibbia education courses at the graduate and post-graduate streams.
www.ccimindia.org.in

Dissolution 
The parliament and president approved the National Commission for Indian Systems of Medicine (NCISM) on September 20, 2020.  In addition to maintaining a national and state register for practitioners, the NCISM legislates for the National Eligibility cum Entrance Test (NEET), and the National Exit Test (NExT).

Since 2021, Central Council of Indian Medicine was dissolved and its role was overtaken by National Commission for Indian System of Medicine.

See also
 Central Council of Homoeopathy

References

External links
 Central Council of Indian Medicine, Official website

College accreditors in India
Organisations based in Delhi
Government agencies established in 1971
1971 establishments in Delhi
Medical education in India
Ayurvedic organisations
Traditional medicine in India
Ministry of AYUSH